Johannes Fritz Emanuel Andersen (1829–1910) was a Danish organist and composer.  He was the father of critic Sophus Andersen.

External links
 

1829 births
1910 deaths
Danish composers
Male composers
Danish classical organists
Male classical organists